Ivan Ivanovych Tsyupa (born 25 June 1993) is a Ukrainian professional football left-back who plays for Kazakh club FC Okzhetpes.

Career
He is product of Shakhtar Donetsk sportive school.

He made his debut for Illichivets Mariupol in the Ukrainian Premier League on 19 May 2013.

References

External links
 
 

1993 births
Living people
Ukrainian footballers
Ukrainian expatriate footballers
Association football defenders
Sportspeople from Donetsk Oblast
FC Mariupol players
FC Illichivets-2 Mariupol players
FC Zirka Kropyvnytskyi players
FC Volyn Lutsk players
FC Karpaty Lviv players
MFK Vranov nad Topľou players
FC Okzhetpes players
Ukrainian Premier League players
Ukrainian First League players
Ukrainian Second League players
Expatriate footballers in Slovakia
Expatriate footballers in Kazakhstan
Ukrainian expatriate sportspeople in Slovakia
Ukrainian expatriate sportspeople in Kazakhstan